Nikola Manojlović (born 1 December 1981) is a Serbian former handball player.

Club career
After starting out at his hometown club Crvena zvezda, Manojlović moved abroad to Swiss team Pfadi Winterthur in early 2005. He would go on to play in Germany (Frisch Auf Göppingen, Rhein-Neckar Löwen, and TuS Nettelstedt-Lübbecke), Romania (HCM Constanța), Slovenia (Gorenje Velenje and Koper), and Belarus (Meshkov Brest).

International career
At international level, Manojlović represented Serbia and Montenegro at the 2006 European Championship. He would later play for Serbia in three major tournaments, winning the silver medal at the 2012 European Championship.

Honours
Crvena zvezda
 Serbia and Montenegro Handball Super League: 2003–04
 Serbia and Montenegro Handball Cup: 2003–04
Gorenje Velenje
 Slovenian First League: 2011–12
Meshkov Brest
 Belarusian Men's Handball Championship: 2014–15
 Belarusian Men's Handball Cup: 2014–15

References

External links

 Olympic record
 
 

1981 births
Living people
Handball players from Belgrade
Serbia and Montenegro male handball players
Serbian male handball players
Olympic handball players of Serbia
Handball players at the 2012 Summer Olympics
RK Crvena zvezda players
Frisch Auf Göppingen players
Rhein-Neckar Löwen players
TuS Nettelstedt-Lübbecke players
Handball-Bundesliga players
Expatriate handball players
Serbia and Montenegro expatriate sportspeople in Switzerland
Serbia and Montenegro expatriate sportspeople in Germany
Serbian expatriate sportspeople in Germany
Serbian expatriate sportspeople in Romania
Serbian expatriate sportspeople in Slovenia
Serbian expatriate sportspeople in Belarus